This was the first edition of the tournament. Cedrik-Marcel Stebe won the final against Alexandre Kudryavtsev 6–4, 4–6, 7–5.

Seeds

Draw

Finals

Top half

Bottom half

References
 Main Draw
 Qualifying Draw

Shanghai Challenger - Singles
2011 Singles